Sensation Comics is the title of an American comic book anthology series published by DC Comics that ran for 109 issues between 1942 and 1952. For most of its run, the lead feature was Wonder Woman, a character which had been introduced in All Star Comics #8 (October 1941). Other characters that appeared included the Black Pirate, the Gay Ghost, Mister Terrific, Wildcat, Sargon the Sorcerer, Hal Mason, the Whip, the Atom, Little Boy Blue, Hop Harrigan, Romance, Inc., Lady Danger, Doctor Pat, and Astra.

The series briefly became a romance title starting with issue #94 (November 1949). Johnny Peril became the lead feature with issue #107, when the theme of the comic changed to a supernatural/mystery format. The title was changed to Sensation Mystery with #110 and ran for another seven issues. The retitled series ended with issue #116 (July–August 1953).

1999 one-shot
The Sensation Comics title was used again in 1999 as the title for one issue of the Justice Society Returns storyline.

2014 revival
DC Comics revived the Sensation Comics series in August 2014 as a "Digital First" series featuring Wonder Woman. The print edition debuted with an October cover date. This series was cancelled in December 2015. The final issue was #17 (cover dated Feb. 2016).

Collected editions
 Wonder Woman Archives
 Volume 1 includes Sensation Comics #1–12, 240 pages, May 1998, 
 Volume 2 includes Sensation Comics #13–17, 240 pages, February 2000, 
 Volume 3 includes Sensation Comics #18–24, 240 pages, June 2002, 
 Volume 4 includes Sensation Comics #25–32, 240 pages, March 2004, 
 Volume 5 includes Sensation Comics #33–40, 240 pages, September 2007, 
 Volume 6 includes Sensation Comics #41–48, 232 pages, July 2010, 
 Volume 7 includes Sensation Comics #49–57, 240 pages, November 2012, 
 The Wonder Woman Chronicles
 Volume 1 includes Sensation Comics #1–9, 192 pages, March 2010, 
 Volume 2 includes Sensation Comics #10–14, 192 pages, December 2011, 
 Volume 3 includes Sensation Comics #15–18, 176 pages, December 2012, 
 JSA All-Stars Archives
 Volume 1 includes Wildcat and Mister Terrific stories from Sensation Comics #1–5, 256 pages, October 2007, 
 Sensation Comics Featuring Wonder Woman
 Volume 1 includes Sensation Comics Featuring Wonder Woman #1–5, 168 pages, April 2015, 
 Volume 2 includes Sensation Comics Featuring Wonder Woman #6–10, 168 pages, October 2015, 
 Volume 3 includes Sensation Comics Featuring Wonder Woman #11–17, 232 pages, May 2016, 
 Wonder Woman: The Golden Age Omnibus
 Volume 1 includes Sensation Comics #1–24, 776 pages, October 2016, 
 Volume 2 includes Sensation Comics #25–48, 768 pages, July 2017, 
 Volume 3 includes Sensation Comics #49–69, 784 pages, November 2018, 
 Volume 4 includes Sensation Comics #70–89, 704 pages, March 2020, 
 Volume 5 includes Sensation Comics #90–104, 688 pages, April 2022,

Millennium Edition
In 2000 and 2001, DC reprinted several of its most notable issues in the Millennium Edition series. The first issue of Sensation Comics was reprinted in this format.

References

External links
.

Sensation Comics and Sensation Comics Featuring Wonder Woman at Mike's Amazing World of Comics

1942 comics debuts
1952 comics endings
2014 comics debuts
2016 comics endings
All-American Publications titles
Comics magazines published in the United States
Comics anthologies
Comics by Robert Kanigher
DC Comics one-shots
DC Comics titles
Defunct American comics
Golden Age comics titles
Magazines disestablished in 1952
Magazines established in 1942
Mystery comics
Romance comics
Superhero comics